Mërgim Fejzullahu (born 29 March 1994) is an Albanian professional footballer who plays as a midfielder for German club 1. FC Bocholt.

References

External links
 
 

1994 births
Living people
People from Fribourg
Albanian footballers
Association football midfielders
Swiss people of Albanian descent
Fortuna Düsseldorf II players
Alemannia Aachen players
Eintracht Braunschweig players
1. FC Saarbrücken players
1. FC Bocholt players
3. Liga players
Regionalliga players
Albanian expatriate footballers
Albanian expatriate sportspeople in Germany
Expatriate footballers in Germany